"We Hate You (Little Girls)/Five Knuckle Shuffle" is a single by English industrial band Throbbing Gristle. It was released as a limited-edition 7" vinyl single by French record label Sordide Sentimental in May 1979.

Background 

The A-side, "We Hate You (Little Girls)", plays at 33 RPM, while the B-side, "Five Knuckle Shuffle", is 45 RPM. "Five Knuckle Shuffle" is slang for masturbation.

Release 

The single came in a double-gatefold A4-size sleeve. Both tracks were later released on the CD version of D.o.A: The Third and Final Report of Throbbing Gristle.

Track listing

External links 

 

Throbbing Gristle songs
1979 singles
1979 songs
Song articles with missing songwriters